The Hopman Cup XXI (also known as the Hyundai Hopman Cup for sponsorship reasons) corresponds to the 21st edition of the Hopman Cup tournament between nations in men's and women's tennis. The tournament was held from 3 January through 9 January 2009 at the Burswood Entertainment Complex in Perth, Western Australia.

Eight nations competed. They were formed of one man and one woman from the same nation. The nations were split into two pools of four in a round robin format, with the group winners contesting the final.

The United States were the defending champions and they were invited to compete again. Chinese Taipei qualified for the event by winning the Asian Hopman Cup.

Slovakia won their third title, defeating Russia in the final 2–0.

Teams and seeding

Group A

Standings

Australia vs. Germany

USA vs. Slovakia

Australia vs. Slovakia

USA vs. Germany

USA vs. Australia

Germany vs. Slovakia

Group B

Standings

France vs. Chinese Taipei

Russia vs. Italy

France vs. Italy

Russia vs. Chinese Taipei

Russia vs. France

Italy vs. Chinese Taipei

Final

Slovakia vs. Russia

References

External links

Hopman Cup
Hopman Cup
2009
Hopman Cup